Rising Sun, Illinois may refer to:
Rising Sun, Pope County, Illinois, an unincorporated community in Pope County
Rising Sun, White County, Illinois, an unincorporated community in White County